The Delaware Fightin' Blue Hens football team represents the University of Delaware in National Collegiate Athletic Association (NCAA) Division I Football Championship Subdivision (FCS) college football. The team is currently led by head coach Ryan Carty  and plays on Tubby Raymond Field at 22,000-seat Delaware Stadium located in Newark, Delaware. The Fightin' Blue Hens have won six national titles in their 117-year history – 1946 (AP College Division), 1963 (UPI College Division), 1971 (AP/UPI College Division), 1972 (AP/UPI College Division), 1979 (Division II), and 2003 (Division I-AA). They returned to the FCS National Championship game in 2007 and 2010.
The program has produced NFL quarterbacks Rich Gannon, Joe Flacco, Jeff Komlo, Pat Devlin and Scott Brunner.
The Blue Hens are recognized as a perennial power in FCS football and Delaware was the only FCS program to average more than 20,000 fans per regular-season home game for each season from 1999 to 2010.

History

The program's long history began in the late 1800s, but the tradition did not truly begin to take shape until the arrival of Bill Murray in 1940. During his 11 seasons at the helm, the Fightin' Blue Hens compiled a record of 49–16–2 with one National Championship in 1946, which culminated in a win over Rollins in the now-defunct Cigar Bowl. That was good for an impressive .747 winning percentage. After Murray departed to take over at Duke University in 1950, David M. Nelson came on board as head coach.

During his time at UD, Nelson developed the Delaware Wing-T offensive system. This system, strongly rooted in running the football and deceptive fake hand-offs, became the identity of Delaware football for nearly 50 years. Nelson also brought with him another icon of Delaware football: the "winged" helmet. The iconic "Michigan" style helmet was developed by Nelson's coach at Michigan, Fritz Crisler, who first used the helmet design when he was head coach at Princeton (albeit in black and orange). Nelson played for Crisler when Crisler was head coach at Michigan, and Nelson brought the helmet design with him to every team he coached (Hillsdale College, Harvard, Maine and Delaware). Nelson stepped down as football coach in 1965, and in his 15 years (1951–1965), the Hens compiled an 84–42–2 (.664) record with one National Championship in 1963 and a bowl win over Kent State in the now-defunct Refrigerator Bowl.

In 1966, an assistant football and baseball coach named Harold "Tubby" Raymond took over, and after a rocky start (the team recorded a 2–7 record in his second season) became the face of Delaware football for 36 seasons. While Nelson developed the Delaware Wing-T, Raymond perfected it. When he retired in 2001, Raymond had racked up 300 wins against 119 losses and three ties, good for a .714 win percentage. His teams earned 14 Lambert Cup Trophies (as the best team in the east in a particular division), four national semi-finals, and three National Championships in 1971, 1972, and 1979.  His 300 wins account for nearly half of the football victories in school history. These three men (Murray, Nelson and Raymond) are all enshrined in the College Football Hall of Fame in Atlanta, Georgia. Georgia Tech is the only other school to place three consecutive coaches into the College Football Hall of Fame.

The team has had much success on the field.  In addition to the national championships listed above, notable program victories include multiple wins over Football Bowl Subdivision (FBS) schools Navy (including a win at Navy's Homecoming game during a year when they went to a bowl game), Maryland, Rutgers, and Temple.  Speculation regularly exists regarding whether the Blue Hens will "move up" to the FBS level at some point. The University of Delaware has more than 60 wins against opponents playing at the highest level, whether that was FBS (since 2006), I-A, or the University level (prior to 1978). However, whereas most I-AA schools move up because of the perception of increased money and prestige, UD has an extremely profitable football program, and it is already well-regarded academically and athletically.

"We're the LSU; we're the Georgia, the Florida of Division I-AA", Delaware coach K. C. Keeler said in American Football Monthly in September 2004. "We have every resource. There's some people who have better resources than we do, but in general, the college campus we have is in one of the greatest college towns in America, and the academics ... we led the nation last year in out-of-state applications, more than Michigan or Texas. But that's what this school has become – everybody wants to come to school here."

While most schools at the FCS level can expect 8,000–10,000 fans for a football game on a good day, the Fightin' Blue Hens can expect sellout crowds of over 22,000 at every home contest; Delaware was the only FCS program to average more than 20,000 fans per regular-season home game for each season from 1999 to 2010.  Since Delaware Stadium opened in 1952, it has undergone four major expansions to come to its current capacity of 22,000 (in the 1970s it actually seated over 23,000, but subsequent modifications have reduced the capacity to the current number).  The home attendance record was set in 1973 on October 27 against Temple University with 23,619 fans, and attendance has exceeded 22,000 fans frequently. When the Fightin' Blue Hens have a home game, the stadium population becomes the fourth largest city in Delaware—behind Wilmington, Dover, and Newark itself. Maine head coach Jack Cosgrove told Keeler that playing Delaware at Delaware Stadium is the highlight of many of his players' collegiate careers because of their large fan support. In 2011, Sporting News ranked Newark 162 on its list of the 271 Best Sports Cities.

On June 19, 2008, Keeler was granted a 10-year contract extension that was intended to keep him on as head coach of the Blue Hens through the 2017 season. The Homecoming Game versus William & Mary on October 18, 2008, marked the first time in 18 years that the Fightin' Blue Hens did not score a touchdown in a home game. The final score of 27–3 also made Delaware's third straight loss scoring ten points or fewer for the first time since the end of the 1983 season. Delaware's eighth loss, to Villanova in the final game of the season, ended a season that saw it lose eight games for the first time in 117 seasons. The Fightin' Blue Hens were one of only four teams in the NCAA to never lose eight games in a season, the others being Michigan (which lost its 8th game a week before the Hens), Tennessee, and Ohio State.

Keeler was fired on January 7, 2013, following the 2012 season in which his team posted a 5−6 record. Delaware hired Rutgers offensive coordinator Dave Brock as the team's head coach on January 18, 2013.

Brock was unable to maintain any of the success or momentum of his predecessors, could not recruit as successfully as his predecessors, and oversaw a precipitous decline in the program's on and off field fortunes.  He became the first head coach in the 90+ year history of Delaware football to be fired in-season, on October 17, 2016.  He was replaced on an interim basis by assistant coach Dennis Dottin-Carter, who completed the 2016 season.  The team never made the FCS playoffs under his tenure. The team hired Richmond head coach Danny Rocco on December 13, 2016.  Rocco was fired at the end of the 2021 season.

With a September 7, 2019 victory over the Rhode Island Rams, Delaware became the 39th team in the NCAA with 700 wins.

On December 10, 2021, Delaware named former UD quarterback Ryan Carty as their new head coach.  Carty spent 11 years on the New Hampshire coaching staff, and spent 4 years as offensive coordinator at Sam Houston State under Keeler.

Head coaches

Conference affiliations

1889–1945: Independent
1946: Mason–Dixon Conference
1947–1955: Independent
1956–1957: NCAA College Division Independent
1958–1969: Middle Atlantic Conference (NCAA College Division)
1970–1972: NCAA College Division Independent

1973–1979: NCAA Division II Independent
1980–1985: NCAA Division I-AA Independent
1986–1996: Yankee Conference (NCAA Division I-AA)
1997–2006: Atlantic 10 Conference (NCAA Division I-AA/FCS)
2007–present: Colonial Athletic Association (NCAA Division I FCS)

Postseason results

Championships

National championships

Conference championships

† Co-champions

Bowl games
Delaware has appeared in 11 bowl games and have a 8–3 bowl record.

Division I-AA/FCS playoffs
The Fightin' Blue Hens have appeared in the Division I-AA/FCS Playoffs eighteen times. Their combined record is 25–17. They were I-AA National Champions in 2003.

Division II playoffs results
The Fightin' Blue Hens have appeared in the Division II playoffs five times with an overall record of 7–4. They were Division II National Champions in 1979.

Rivalries

Villanova

Delaware State

Delaware and Delaware State first played against each other on November 23, 2007, in Newark, Delaware, in the first round of the NCAA Division I National Championship Tournament. The Blue Hens defeated the Hornets 44–7 in front of 19,765 people, the largest playoff crowd in Delaware Stadium history.

Prior to the 2009 season, the University of Delaware had not scheduled a regular season game versus Delaware State University, the state's other Football Championship Subdivision team.  A 2007 guest editorial at ESPN.com's Page 2 claimed that this has to do with the fact that Delaware State is a Historically Black College. However, Delaware has scheduled and played regular season games against several other Historically Black Colleges and Universities such as Morgan State University and North Carolina A&T.

On February 25, 2009, coach K.C. Keeler joined Delaware State University coach Al Lavan along with school officials and state politicians in Dover, Delaware, to announce that their schools had signed on to play the first regular season game in their history. Additionally, a three-game series was scheduled for September 2012, 2013, and 2014.  All games in the series were held at Delaware Stadium in Newark, because its seating capacity of 22,000 is much larger than that of Delaware State's Alumni Stadium. The schools had been engaged in talks to play a game as early as 2009, but Furman University, which had previously signed a contract to play a home-and-away series with UD, backed out of game two which was scheduled to be played at UD in order to play University of Missouri and garner a larger payday. This left the University of Delaware with an open date to fill with only a few months before the season started and the two sides quickly completed the deal.

The first game was played on September 19, 2009, at Delaware Stadium, with the winning Blue Hens receiving the new traveling trophy, the First State Cup, following a 27–17 victory.  Delaware has been victorious in each of their nine subsequent match-ups (2011, 2012, 2013, 2014, 2016, 2017,2019, 2021, 2022).

James Madison

William & Mary

West Chester University

Blue Hens in the pros

Active
CB Tenny Adewusi – Dallas Renegades (2020), San Antonio Brahmas (2023–present)
LS Joe Fortunato – Arizona Cardinals (2023–present)
CB Nijuel Hill – Vegas Vipers (2023–present)
RB Wes Hills – Detroit Lions (2019), Hamilton Tiger-Cats (2021–2022), New Orleans Breakers (2023–present)
DT Cam Kitchen – BC Lions (2022–present)
RB Dejoun Lee – Houston Roughnecks (2023–present)
DT Bilal Nichols – Chicago Bears (2018–2021), Las Vegas Raiders (2022–present)
WR Vinny Papale – Tampa Bay Bandits (2022), Memphis Showboats (2023–present)
CB Roman Tatum – Los Angeles Wildcats (2020), Orlando Guardians (2023–present)
WR Joe Walker – Michigan Panthers (2022–present)

Former
DB Mike Adams – San Francisco 49ers (2004–06), Cleveland Browns (2007–11), Denver Broncos (2012–13), Indianapolis Colts (2014–2016), Carolina Panthers (2017–2018), Houston Texans (2019)
S Nasir Adderley – Los Angeles Chargers (2019–2022)
DE Michael Atunrase – Nebraska Danger (2012–2013), Cedar Rapids Titans (2013)
DB Kenny Bailey – New Jersey Red Dogs (2000), New Jersey Gladiators (2001)
TE Josh Baker – New York Jets (2011)
DL Quincy Barr – Tampa Bay Storm (2014)
LB Darrell Booker – Ottawa Rough Riders (1989)
TE Nick Boyle – Baltimore Ravens (2015–2022)
DB Roger Brown – Georgia Force (2012)
QB Scott Brunner – New York Giants (1980–84), St. Louis Cardinals (1985)
CB Marcus Burley – Jacksonville Jaguars (2013), Seattle Seahawks (2014−2015), Cleveland Browns (2016), Houston Texans (2017)
RB Keith Burnell – Hamilton Tiger-Cats (2005)
OL Mike Byrne – Calgary Stampeders (2008–09), Pittsburgh Power (2011)
LB Mondoe Davis – Montreal Alouettes (2007)
QB Pat Devlin – Miami Dolphins (2011–13), Cleveland Browns (2015)
LB Leon Dombrowski – New York Titans (1960)
WR Jamin Elliott – Chicago Bears (2002), Georgia Force (2006), Atlanta Falcons (2006)
QB Joe Flacco – Baltimore Ravens (2008–2018), Denver Broncos (2019), New York Jets (2020), Philadelphia Eagles (2021), New York Jets (2021–2022); Super Bowl XLVII Most Valuable Player
QB Rich Gannon – Minnesota Vikings (1987–92), Washington Redskins (1993), Kansas City Chiefs (1995–1998), Oakland Raiders (1999–2004); won the 2002 NFL Most Valuable Player and played in Super Bowl XXXVII as a member of the Raiders
C Gino Gradkowski – Baltimore Ravens (2012–14), Atlanta Falcons (2015), Carolina Panthers (2016), Denver Broncos (2018), Super Bowl XLVII winner
DB Simba Gwashavanhu – Jacksonville Sharks (2019)
QB Andy Hall – Philadelphia Eagles (2005–06)
DL Matt Hardison – Tampa Bay Storm (2014), New Orleans VooDoo (2015), Las Vegas Outlaws (2015), Cleveland Gladiators (2016)
DB Sidney Haugabrook – Hamilton Tiger-Cats (2005), Las Vegas Gladiators (2007), Columbus Destroyers (2008)
OL Conway Hayman – Houston Oilers (1975–80)
DB Travis Hawkins – Toronto Argonauts (2015), Winnipeg Blue Bombers (2016), Montreal Alouettes (2017)
OL Kheon Hendricks – Milwaukee Iron (2010)
DB Tim Jacobs – Cleveland Browns (1993–95), Miami Dolphins (1996–1997)
DL Dennis Johnson – Washington Redskins (1974–77), Buffalo Bills (1978), Toronto Argonauts (1979–80)
OT Greg Justice – Austin Wranglers (2007)
DT Zach Kerr – Indianapolis Colts (2014–2016), Denver Broncos (2017–2018), Arizona Cardinals (2019), Carolina Panthers (2020), San Francisco 49ers (2021), Arizona Cardinals (2021), Cincinnati Bengals (2021); played in Super Bowl LVI as a member of the Bengals
QB Jeff Komlo – Detroit Lions (1979–81), Atlanta Falcons (1982), Tampa Bay Buccaneers (1983)
DB Dale Koscielski – Chicago Rush (2001–02), Los Angeles Avengers (2002), Chicago Rush (2003)
WR Keita Malloy – Texas Terror (1996)
DE Matt Marcorelle – Georgia Force (2012), Jacksonville Sharks (2013)
DT Joe McGrail – Buffalo Bills (1987)
LB Joe McHale – New England Patriots (1987)
LB Larry McSeed – Montreal Alouettes (1997), Saskatchewan Roughriders (1998), Montreal Alouettes (1998)
DL Joe Minucci – Nashville Kats (2005–07), Cleveland Gladiators (2008)
TE Jeff Modesitt – Tampa Bay Buccaneers (1987)
QB Matt Nagy – New York Dragons (2002), Carolina Cobras (2004), Georgia Force (2005–06), Columbus Destroyers (2007–08)
WR Andrew Opoku – FXFL Blacktips (2015)
TE Ben Patrick – Arizona Cardinals (2007–10); scored a touchdown in Super Bowl XLIII
C Bob Patton – Buffalo Bills (1976)
RB Dan Reeder – Pittsburgh Steelers (1986–87)
LB Troy Reeder – Los Angeles Rams (2019–2021), Los Angeles Chargers (2022); won Super Bowl LVI
DL Mike Renna –London Monarchs (1991) Charlotte Rage (1993)
LB Erik Ringoen – Toronto Argonauts (1992)
DB George Schmitt – St. Louis Cardinals (1983)
K Jon Striefsky – Philadelphia Soul (2011), Jacksonville Sharks (2012)
OT Jim Stull – Toronto Argonauts (2000), New York/New Jersey Hitmen (2001)
S Ivory Sully – Los Angeles Rams (1979–84), Tampa Bay Buccaneers (1985–86), Detroit Lions (1987); played in Super Bowl XIV as a member of the Rams
DE Ronald Talley – Arizona Cardinals (2011–13)
DE Hal Thompson – Brooklyn Dodgers (1947–48)
DE Laith Wallschleger – Jacksonville Sharks (2016)
DB Anthony Walters – Chicago Bears (2011–14)
DL Richard Washington – Jacksonville Sharks (2011), Kansas City Command (2012)
LB Ali Witherspoon – Montreal Concordes (1985)
DL Blaine Woodson – Ottawa Redblacks (2018)
LB Paul Worrilow – Atlanta Falcons (2013–2016), Detroit Lions (2017), Philadelphia Eagles (2018), New York Jets (2019)

Notes

Draft picks

Future non-conference opponents
Announced schedules as of November 26, 2022.

† – 11 Game FCS Regular Season
‡ – 12 Game FCS Regular Season

College Football Hall of Fame inductees

References

External links

 

 
American football teams established in 1889
1889 establishments in Delaware